Hans Christian Engelbreth Petersen (21 December 1937 – 17 September 2009) was a Norwegian ice hockey player, born in Oslo. He played for the Norwegian national ice hockey team, and  participated at the Winter Olympics in 1964 and in 1968.

References

External links

1937 births
2009 deaths
Ice hockey players at the 1964 Winter Olympics
Ice hockey players at the 1968 Winter Olympics
Norwegian ice hockey players
Olympic ice hockey players of Norway
Ice hockey people from Oslo